The 1992–93 Irish Cup was the 113th edition of Northern Ireland's premier football knock-out cup competition. It concluded on 11 May 1993.

Bangor; appearing in their first final since 1938, won for the first time with a 1–0 victory over Ards in the second replay. The first two matches has ended at 1–1 after extra time. Subsequently it was decided that there would only be one final replay, in which penalties would be used to determine the winner if necessary. Eventually the rules were changed to remove replays altogether, with penalties being used if necessary after extra time in the first match.

Results

First round
The following teams were given byes into the second round: 1st Shankill NISC, Bangor Amateurs, Cookstown Royals, Donard Hospital, East Belfast, Islandmagee, Killyleagh Youth, Larne Tech Old Boys, Queen's University, Rathfriland Rangers and Sirocco Works.

|}

Replays

|}

Second round

|}

Replay

|}

Third round

|}

Replays

|}

Fourth round

|}

Replays

|}

Fifth round

|}

Replays

|}

Sixth round

|}

Replays

|}

Quarter-finals

|}

Replays

|}

Semi-finals

|}

Final

Replay

Second replay

References

1992–93
1992–93 domestic association football cups
Cup